Rajić is a village near Novska, Croatia, with a population of 875.

References

Populated places in Sisak-Moslavina County